Lye or The Lye is an area in the Dudley Metropolitan Borough, in the West Midlands county, England,  east of Stourbridge and borders with Pedmore and Wollescote.

History
Lye was formerly a village within the parish of Oldswinford, historically situated within the boundaries of the county of Worcestershire. It used to be famous for the manufacture of nails, anvils, vices, chain, crucibles and firebricks. Lye Waste, adjacent to the original village of Lye, was an area of uncultivated common land but it was settled by people who, by building houses including a fireplace within 24 hours by using mud and clay as the main building materials, acquired freehold rights as a result of the passing of the Inclosure Acts  from 1604 onwards, and it became thickly built upon.

Bentley's History, Guide and Classified Directory of Stourbridge of 1841, describes the district of Lye and Lye Waste as "almost one continued series of humble dwellings and work-shops interspersed at intervals with others of a more respectable appearance". Nailmaking was the main occupation but anvils, chains, vices, bricks and tobacco pipes were also made. The writer observes that the "poor artizan in many of the trades appears to get a very small remuneration for his labour, and to make an improvident use of much of even the little he gets."  

The village of Careless Green, now part of Lye but once a separate village immediately to the south-east, was noted for insurance clubs called Stewpony societies and the Stewpony Allotment Society which tried to improve conditions for the labouring classes.

Places of interest
The local cemetery is the Lye and Wollescote Cemetery, which contains a pair of Grade II listed chapels.

Lye is also home to Lye Town F.C., which has competed in the West Midlands Regional League since 1947.  Its home ground is The Sports Ground, which it shares with the resident cricket club.

Lye railway station serves the community, and is situated on the Stourbridge–Birmingham mainline.

Sir Cedric Hardwicke 
Lye is the birthplace of the actor Sir Cedric Hardwicke, who is commemorated by a sculpture by Tim Tolkien, commissioned by Dudley Metropolitan Borough Council. The memorial takes the form of a giant filmstrip, the illuminated cut metal panels illustrating scenes from some of his best-known films which include The Hunchback of Notre Dame, Things to Come, and The Ghost of Frankenstein. It was unveiled in November 2005 and is located at Lye Cross near his childhood home.

Sport
The town has an association football club, Lye Town FC. The club were West Midlands (Regional) League Premier Division champions in 2013–14.

Further reading 
 Britain In Old Photographs: Lye And Wollescote Denys Brooks and Pat Dunn, 1997.
 A Brief History of Lye & Wollescote Don Cochrane, 2005.

References

External links 

 River Stour
 Christ Church and Community Website
 LyeTown.co.uk Nostalgic and historical photographs of Lye
 Home Webpage of Lye Town Football Club

Areas of Dudley